Postpartum confinement is a traditional practice following childbirth. Those who follow these customs typically begin immediately after the birth, and the seclusion or special treatment lasts for a culturally variable length: typically for one month or 30 days, 26 days, up to 40 days, two months, or 100 days.  This postnatal recuperation can include care practices in regards of "traditional health beliefs, taboos, rituals, and proscriptions." The practice used to be known as "lying-in", which, as the term suggests, centres around bed rest. In some cultures it may be connected to taboos concerning impurity after childbirth.

Overview

Postpartum confinement refers both to the mother and the baby. Human newborns are so underdeveloped that pediatricians such as Harvey Karp refer to the first three months as the "fourth trimester". The weeks of rest while the mother heals also protect the infant as it adjusts to the world, and both learn the skills of breastfeeding.

Almost all countries have some form of maternity leave. Many countries encourage men to take some paternity leave, but even those that mandate that some of the shared parental leave must be used by the father ("father's quota") acknowledge that the mother needs time off work to recover from the childbirth and deal with the postpartum physiological changes.

A 2016 American book describes the difficulties of documenting these "global grandmotherly customs" but asserts that "like a golden rope connecting women from one generation to the next, the protocol of caring for the new mother by unburdening her of responsibilities and ensuring she rests and eats shows up in wildly diverse places". These customs have been documented in dozens of academic studies, and commonly include support for the new mother (including a release from household chores), rest, special foods to eat (and ones to avoid), specific hygiene practices, and ways of caring for the newborn.

 and Margaret Mead wrote in 1955 that the postpartum period meant a "woman can be cherished and pampered without feeling inadequate or shamed". The 2016 review that quoted them cites customs from around the world, from Biblical times to modern Greece:

Health effects

One meta-review of studies concluded, "There is little consistent evidence that confinement practices reduce postpartum depression."

Postpartum confinement by region

Asia

China

Postpartum confinement is well-documented in China, where the custom is known as "sitting the month".

"Sitting the month": 坐月子 "Zuò yuè zi" in Mandarin or 坐月 "Co5 Jyut2" in Cantonese.  The custom, documented as far back as the year 960, is referred to as 'confinement' as women are advised to stay indoors for recovery from the trauma of birth and for feeding the newborn baby. Aspects of traditional Chinese medicine are included, with a special focus on eating foods considered to be nourishing for the body and helping with the production of breastmilk. In Guangdong and neighboring regions, new mothers are barred from visitors until the baby is 12 days old, marked by a celebration called 'Twelve mornings' (known as 十二朝). From this day onwards, Cantonese families with a new baby usually share their joy through giving away food gifts, while some families mark the occasion by paying tribute to their ancestors.

In ancient China, women of certain ethnic groups in the South would resume work right after birth, and allow the men to practice postpartum confinement instead. (See Couvade).

Aspects of the practice of "sitting the month" continue today, especially in Hong Kong and Taiwan, and mother and baby sometimes spend the month in special clinics. At the end of this period, when the "month is fulfilled" (manyue), the mother receives relatives and friends who bring special foods such as red eggs.

Everyday habits and personal hygiene practices 
In traditional China, the mother and child were kept separate from the rest of the household. The mother was not permitted to bathe, wash her hair, or weep, because these activities were believed to affect the breast milk.

Nowadays, however, new mothers may wash their hair or take a bath or shower infrequently during the postpartum period, but it is claimed to be important to dry their body immediately afterwards with a clean towel and their hair properly using a hair dryer. It is also claimed to be important for women to wrap up warm and minimize the amount of skin exposed, as it was believed that they may catch a cold during this vulnerable time.

Special foods 

The custom of confinement advises new mothers to choose energy and protein-rich foods to recover energy levels, help shrink the uterus, and for the perineum to heal. This is also important for the production of breastmilk. Among the traditionally recommended galactogogues were rich porridge, fish soup, and hard-boiled eggs. Sometimes, new mothers only begin to consume special herbal foods after all the lochia is discharged.

A common dish is pork knuckles with ginger and black vinegar as pork knuckles are believed to help replenish calcium levels in women. Ginger is featured in many dishes, as it is believed that it can remove the 'wind' accumulated in the body during pregnancy. Meat-based soup broths are also commonly consumed to provide hydration and added nutrients.

Indian subcontinent
In India it is called jaappa (also transliterated japa); in Pakistan, sawa mahina ("five weeks").

Most traditional Indians follow the 40-day confinement and recuperation period also known as the jaappa (in Hindi). A special diet to facilitate milk production and increase hemoglobin levels is followed. Sex is not allowed during this time. In Hindu culture, this time after childbirth was traditionally considered a period of relative impurity (asaucham), and a period of confinement of 10–40 days (known as purudu) was recommended for the mother and the baby. During this period, she was exempted from usual household chores and religious rites. The father was purified by a ritual bath before visiting the mother in confinement.

In the event of a stillbirth, the period of impurity for both parents was 24 hours.

Many Indian subcultures have their own traditions after birth. This birth period is called Virdi (Marathi), which lasts for 10 days after birth and includes complete abstinence from puja or temple visits.

In Pakistan, postpartum tradition is known as sawa mahina ("five weeks").

Iran 
In Persian culture it is called chilla, i.e. "forty days".

Korea 
Korean women spend samchil-il (three seven days, 21 days) in confinement, receiving sanhujori (postpartum care). In the past, during the samchil-il period, geumjul (taboo rope) made with saekki and various symbolic objects, such as chili peppers (for a boy) and coal (for a girl), was hung over the gate to denote the childbirth and restrict visitor access.

Thailand 
Thailand has various customs. New mothers used to be encouraged to lie in a warm bed near the fire for 30 days, a practice known as yu fai. This has been adapted into a form of Thai massage. Kao krachome is a type of herbal medicine in which the steam from the boiled plants is inhaled. Ya dong involves herbal medicine taken internally. Thai immigrants to Sweden report using the steam bath to heal after childbirth, although the correct ingredients are not easy to find. Thai Australians who had had caesarian sections felt that they did not need to - in fact, ought not to - undergo these rituals.

Europe

The term used in English, now old-fashioned or archaic, was once used to name maternity hospitals, for example the General Lying-In Hospital in London. A 1932 Canadian publication refers to lying-in as ranging from two weeks to two months. These weeks ended with the re-introduction of the mother to the community in the Christian ceremony of the churching of women.

Lying-in features in Christian art, notably Birth of Jesus paintings. One of the gifts presented to the new mother in Renaissance Florence was a desco da parto, a special form of painted tray. Equivalent presents in contemporary culture include baby showers and push presents.

Special foods included caudle, a restorative drink. "Taking caudle" was a metonym for postpartum social visits.

Americas

Latin America 
In Latin American countries it is called la cuarentena, i.e. "forty days" (a cognate with the English word "quarantine"). It is practised in parts of Latin America, and amongst immigrant communities in the United States. It is described as "intergenerational family ritual that facilitated adaptation to parenthood", including some paternal role reversal.

See also

 Postpartum care
 Maternal bond and Attachment theory
 Culture and menstruation, including places and times of seclusion
 Impurity after childbirth
 Grandmother hypothesis
 Women-only space
 Wet nurse
 Parental investment in humans
 Sex after childbirth

References

Further reading
 The First Forty Days: The Essential Art of Nourishing the New Mother. By Heng Ou, 2016
 Zuo Yuezi: An American Mother's Guide to Chinese Postpartum Recovery. by Guang Ming Whitley

Chinese culture
Childbirth
Pseudoscience
Women's culture
Breastfeeding
Human development
Motherhood
Anthropology
Quarantine
Taboo
Human pregnancy